is a Japanese badminton player. In the national event, she play for the Tonami Transportation.

Career 
Nidaira came from the Mito, Ibaraki, and started playing badminton at aged five. Since the elementary school she has won several national championships, and in 2009, she joined the Japanese junior team. In 2013, she competed at the U-17 Asian Junior Championships, and won the girls' singles gold. After graduating from high school, she joined the Tonami Transportation team. Nidaira was part of the Japanese U-19 team, that won the mixed team bronze medal at the 2014, 2016 World Junior Championships, and in the girls' singles event in 2015. She also won the mixed team bronze at the 2015 and 2016 Asian Junior Championships.

Nidaira made a debut in the senior event in 2015, and at the 2016 Korea Masters, a Grand Prix Gold tournament, she finished in the semifinals round, lose to host player Lee Jang-mi in the straight games. In 2017, she was the runner-up at the Smiling Fish International tournament in Thailand, and won her first senior international title at the Yonex / K&D Graphics International in the United States.

Achievements

BWF World Junior Championships 
Girls' singles

BWF World Tour (1 runner-up) 
The BWF World Tour, which was announced on 19 March 2017 and implemented in 2018, is a series of elite badminton tournaments sanctioned by the Badminton World Federation (BWF). The BWF World Tour is divided into levels of World Tour Finals, Super 1000, Super 750, Super 500, Super 300 (part of the HSBC World Tour), and the BWF Tour Super 100.

Women's singles

BWF International Challenge/Series (6 titles, 4 runners-up) 

Women's singles

  BWF International Challenge tournament
  BWF International Series tournament

References

External links 

 
 Natsuki Nidaira at www.tonami-badminton.jp

Living people
1998 births
People from Mito, Ibaraki
Sportspeople from Ibaraki Prefecture
Japanese female badminton players
21st-century Japanese women